Athol is a city in Kootenai County, Idaho, United States. The population was 692 at the 2010 census, up from 676 in 2000.  It is part of the Coeur d'Alene Metropolitan Statistical Area, which includes the entire county.

Athol is notable for being the location of Silverwood theme park.  Several miles east of town is historic Farragut State Park, located at the southern end of Lake Pend Oreille.  Once completed, the planned Dollar General location will be the chain's first storefront in the state of Idaho.

History

A post office called Athol has been in operation since 1895. The city may be named after the Duke of Atholl.

Geography

Demographics

As of 2000 the median income for a household in the city was $30,595, and the median income for a family was $31,875. Males had a median income of $28,438 versus $17,813 for females. The per capita income for the city was $13,632. About 11.0% of families and 14.5% of the population were below the poverty line, including 10.3% of those under age 18 and 23.7% of those age 65 or over.

2010 census
As of the census of 2010, there were 692 people, 282 households, and 176 families residing in the city. The racial makeup of the city was 97.0% White, 0.9% Native American, and 2.2% from two or more races. Hispanic or Latino of any race were 0.3% of the population.

There were 282 households, of which 29.4% had children under the age of 18 living with them, 47.9% were married couples living together, 8.9% had a female householder with no husband present, 5.7% had a male householder with no wife present, and 37.6% were non-families. 28.0% of all households were made up of individuals, and 10.3% had someone living alone who was 65 years of age or older. The average household size was 2.45 and the average family size was 3.05.

The median age in the city was 41.8 years. 23.7% of residents were under the age of 18; 6.7% were between the ages of 18 and 24; 23.2% were from 25 to 44; 30.8% were from 45 to 64; and 15.6% were 65 years of age or older. The gender makeup of the city was 52.2% male and 47.8% female.

See also
 Duke of Atholl
 Athol, Massachusetts

Notable person
 Hattie Johnson, Olympic shooter, resident of Athol

References

External links
 Kootenai-Shoshone Area Libraries - Athol

Cities in Idaho
Cities in Kootenai County, Idaho